Driven may refer to:

Human behavior 
 Motivated, based on, for example:
Ambition
Desire (philosophy)
Work ethic

Arts, entertainment, and media

Books
 Driven (book), autobiography of Green Bay Packers player Donald Driver

Films
 Driven (1916 film), a British silent film
 Driven (1923 film), an American silent film
 Driven (2001 film), an American film starring Sylvester Stallone
 Driven (2017 film), a Pakistani crime film
 Driven (2018 film) a film about the life of John DeLorean, founder of the DeLorean Motor Company

Music 
 The Driven, an Irish rock band
 Driven (Cueshé album), 2008 album
 Driven (Orphanage album), 2004 album
 "Driven" (Rush song), a song by Canadian rock band Rush from their 1996 album Test For Echo
 "Driven" (Sevendust song), a single from the album Alpha by the heavy metal band Sevendust

Television
 Driven (TV series), a British motoring programme
 "Driven" (CSI: Miami), an episode of CSI: Miami
 "Driven" (NCIS), an episode of NCIS
 ROH Driven, a professional wrestling pay-per-view event

Other uses in arts, entertainment, and media 
 Driven (Canadian magazine), a men's lifestyle magazine
 Driven (video game), a 2001 racing game

Wrestling 
 Driven (2007), a professional wrestling event
 Driven (2008), the second annual Driven professional wrestling event

See also  
 
 Driven to Destruction (disambiguation)
 Driven to Distraction (disambiguation)